Spicy cow feet is a delicacy commonly found in  restaurants, it is otherwise known as nkwobi. The cuisine is common among the people of Igbo ethnic group. it is a soup made up of cuts from cow feet.

Overview
The ingredients and spices needed to make the Nigerian dessert include palm oil, kaun also known as potash, Calabash nutmegs, utazi leaves, pepper, onion etc. An alternative to potash is ngu, spinach can be used instead of utazia if not available for use. Nkwobi is sometimes prepared made at home, even though it is commonly found in restaurants. The soup is made from cow feet boiled with onion and variety of spices Potash mixture is added to palm oil, stirred until yellow and thickened. Crayfish, Calabash nutmeg and grinded pepper are added afterward.  The cooked cow feet into the oil mixture and stirred gently to avoid burning.

See also 

 Cow's trotters
 List of beef dishes
 List of African dishes
 Tripe

References 

Igbo cuisine
Beef dishes